Jesse Clement Gray (12 July 1854 – 24 February 1912) was a British co-operative activist.

Born in Ripley, Derbyshire, Gray's father was the local Baptist minister. In 1860, the family moved to Hebden Bridge, and Gray was educated at the town's grammar school.

Gray left school at the age of thirteen, and became a clerk for the Lancashire and Yorkshire Railway. He was interested in the co-operative movement, and so in 1874 became the assistant secretary of the Hebden Bridge Fustian Society, a full-time post. He proved successful in the role, and was promoted to become the organisation's general secretary before he had even spent six months in the post.

Gray began making a national reputation for himself, championing co-operative production methods, in addition to the co-operative retail which was becoming widespread. In 1883, he was appointed as assistant secretary of the Co-operative Union, and was promoted to become its secretary in 1891. He also became secretary of the International Co-operative Alliance, serving from 1902 until 1908.

In 1906, Gray proposed that the various retail co-operatives in the UK amalgamate, to be run by an elected general council with 150 members. This proposal was not taken up. He retired in 1910, due to failing health, and died in Manchester two years later. He is buried in Hebden Bridge with a monument in the graveyard funded by the movement.

References

1854 births
1912 deaths
British cooperative organizers
People from Ripley, Derbyshire